The Nationalist Front is a loose coalition of radical right and white supremacists. The coalition was formed in 2016 by leaders of the neo-Nazi groups National Socialist Movement (NSM) and Traditionalist Worker Party (TWP). Its aim was to unite white supremacist and white nationalist groups under a common umbrella. Originally the group was named the Aryan Nationalist Alliance and was composed of neo-Nazi, Ku Klux Klan and White power skinhead organizations.

The coalition rebranded itself as the Nationalist Front and was later joined by the neo-Confederate League of the South, the neo-Nazi/alt-right Vanguard America and four other groups such as the Aryan Strikeforce. The ideology of the Nationalist Front centers on a desire for a white ethnostate. The Nationalist Front was a key organizer of the "White Lives Matter" rally in Shelbyville and Murfreesboro, Tennessee, on October 28, 2017. In 2021, there were subsequent White Lives Matter rallies in a number of cities, including New York City, Philadelphia, and Fort Worth, Texas.

History and activities 
Conceived by the leaders of the neo-Nazi groups National Socialist Movement (NSM) and Traditionalist Worker Party (TWP), the coalition was formed in 2016. Its aim was to unite white supremacist and white nationalist groups under a common umbrella. Originally the group was named the Aryan Nationalist Alliance and was composed of neo-Nazi, Ku Klux Klan and White power skinhead organizations, the logo of the group was two hands joined together with the Celtic Cross in the background and multiple Wolfsangels in the circle. The coalition later rebranded itself as the Nationalist Front with a logo that had the group initials "NF" inside a white background with a black circle with stars and the slogan "Iunctus Stamus" (United We Stand) it would also be later joined by the neo-Confederate League of the South, the neo-Nazi/alt-right Vanguard America and four other groups such as the Aryan Strikeforce.

The ideology of the Nationalist Front centers on a desire for a white ethnostate. The groups participated in the August 2017 Unite the Right rally in Charlottesville, Virginia. Earlier in the year, it organized the white supremacist rally in Pikeville, Kentucky, which attracted 100 to 125 supporters. The coalition and its member groups, are considered extremist organizations.

Membership 
 National Socialist Movement (2017–present)
 Traditionalist Worker Party (2017–2018; defunct)
 League of the South (2017–2018)
 Vanguard America (2017–present, splintered into Patriot Front)

References

2016 establishments in the United States
American fascist movements
Neo-Nazi organizations in the United States
Critics of Black Lives Matter
Political party alliances in the United States
Neo-Confederate organizations